Saywell is a surname. Notable people with the surname include:

John Saywell (1929–2011), Canadian historian
Michael Saywell (born 1942), British equestrian
William Saywell (1643–1701), English Anglican archdeacon and academic

See also
Samwell

English-language surnames